Cychrus angustatus is a species of ground beetle in the subfamily of Carabinae. It was described by David Heinrich Hoppe and Christian Friedrich Hornschuch in 1825.

Distribution
This species can be found in Austria, Bosnia and Herzegovina, Croatia, France, Italy, Slovenia and Switzerland.

References

angustatus
Beetles described in 1825